Muslim Girls Training & General Civilization Class (MGT & GCC) is the all-female training program of the Nation of Islam. It is often considered to be the counterpart for girls and women to the Fruit of Islam.

History
The Muslim Girls Training & General Civilization Class is one of the institutions established in 1933 by Wallace Fard Muhammad, founder of the Nation of Islam. He also established the University of Islam schools and the Fruit of Islam in that year before vanishing in 1934. The classes were developed to teach domestic duties like cooking and nutrition, sewing, cleaning, housekeeping, child-rearing, religious instruction and the role of women in Muslim life and even personal hygiene and self-defense. Classes are generally held at least once a week.

References

Nation of Islam
Women's religious organizations